The eighth annual Premios MTV Latinoamérica 2009 took place on October 15, 2009 in Bogotá, Colombia at Corferias, at the Gibson Amphitheatre in Los Angeles, United States, Mexico City, Mexico and Buenos Aires, Argentina.

René Pérez Joglar, also known as Residente  from Calle 13, alongside pop singer Nelly Furtado served as the hosts.  Sylvia Villagran was the announcer for the show.

Regional awards were given out on special events recorded prior to the main show to be held on October 15 at the Gibson Amphitheatre in Los Angeles. Buenos Aires was the first city to host this year's event. Miranda! and Pablo Lescano performed at Espacio Darwin on September 30. The Hipódromo de las Américas at Mexico City was the second venue to host the regional event on October 5. Jesse & Joy, Panda and Placebo performed. The next city to host the regional event was Bogotá at Corferias on October 11. Alejandro Sanz, Doctor Krápula, Fanny Lu, Shakira and The Veronicas performed. 

Jose Tillan was the Executive Producer of the event. This was the final installment of the Latin American MTV Awards before being canceled since 2010 and replaced with MTV World Stage concerts in Mexico.

Nominations
Winners are in bold text.

Artist of the Year
 Kudai
 Paulina Rubio
 Wisin & Yandel
 Ximena Sariñana
 Zoé

Video of the Year
 Calle 13 — "Electro Movimiento"
 Nelly Furtado — "Manos al Aire"
 Paulina Rubio — "Causa y Efecto" 
 Shakira — "Loba"
 Wisin & Yandel — "Abusadora"

Song of the Year
 Kings of Leon — "Use Somebody"
 Lady Gaga — "Poker Face"
 Nelly Furtado — "Manos al Aire"
 Shakira — "Loba"
 Wisin & Yandel — "Abusadora"

Best Solo Artist
 Andrés Calamaro
 Beto Cuevas
 Daddy Yankee
 Paulina Rubio
 Ximena Sariñana

Best Group or Duet
 Calle 13
 Jesse & Joy
 Panda
 Wisin & Yandel
 Zoé

Best Pop Artist
 Fanny Lu
 Jesse & Joy
 Miranda!
 Paulina Rubio
 Reik

Best Rock Artist
 Andrés Calamaro
 Los Fabulosos Cadillacs
 Moderatto
 Motel
 Zoé

Best Alternative Artist
 Austin TV
 División Minúscula
 Kinky
 Panda
 Plastilina Mosh

Best Urban Artist
 Calle 13
 Cartel de Santa
 Daddy Yankee
 Dante
 Wisin & Yandel

Best Pop Artist — International
 Britney Spears
 Jonas Brothers
 Lady Gaga
 Miley Cyrus
 Taylor Swift

Best Rock Artist — International
 Coldplay
 Fall Out Boy
 Green Day
 Linkin Park
 Metallica

Best New Artist — International
 Ashley Tisdale
 Lady Gaga
 McFly
 Taylor Swift
 The Veronicas

Best Artist — North
 Jesse & Joy
 Panda
 Paulina Rubio
 Ximena Sariñana
 Zoé

Best New Artist — North
 Hello Seahorse!
 Jotdog
 Paty Cantú
 Sandoval
 Tush

Best Artist — Central
 Aterciopelados
 Doctor Krápula
 Don Tetto
 Fanny Lu
 Kudai

Best New Artist — Central
 Ádammo
 Bomba Estéreo
 El Sie7e
 Nicole Natalino
 Zaturno

Best Artist — South
 Andrés Calamaro
 Babasónicos
 Infierno 18
 Los Fabulosos Cadillacs
 Miranda!

Best New Artist — South
 Banda de Turistas
 F-A
 Loli Molina
 Onda Vaga
 Walter Domínguez

Best MTV Tr3́s Artist
 Aventura
 Calle 13
 Pitbull
 Tito El Bambino
 Wisin & Yandel

Best New MTV Tr3́s Artist
 Da' Zoo
 Franco "El Gorila"
 Jazmín López
 Marcy Place
 Pee Wee

Breakthrough Artist
 Ádammo
 Fanny Lu
 Massacre
 Paty Cantú
 Sonohra

"La Zona" Award
 Ádammo
 Alika & Nueva Alianza
 Cienfue
 Hello Seahorse!
 Los Daniels
 Robot Zonda
No public voting

Fashionista Award — Female
 Fanny Lu
 Hayley Williams (from Paramore)
 Katy Perry
 Miley Cyrus
 Shakira

Fashionista Award — Male
 Diego Fainello (from Sonohra)
 Gabe Saporta (from Cobra Starship)
 José "Pepe" Madero (from Panda)
 Nick Jonas (from the Jonas Brothers)
 Pete Wentz (from Fall Out Boy)

Best Fan Club
 Britney Spears (President: Erik Magdaleno)
 Jonas Brothers (President: Christina Méndez)
 Metallica (President: Jorge Armando Fernández)
 Shakira (President: Dario Castillo)
 Taylor Swift (President: Sue Ann Carol Castro Cipriano)

Best Video Game Soundtrack
 FIFA 09
 Guitar Hero: Metallica
 Guitar Hero World Tour
 Rock Band — Green Day Pack
 Shaun White Snowboarding

Best Ringtone
 Britney Spears — "Womanizer"
 Katy Perry — "Hot n Cold"
 Lady Gaga — "Poker Face"
 Metro Station — "Shake It"
 Wisin & Yandel — "Abusadora"

Best Movie
 Transformers: Revenge of the Fallen
 Twilight

Best Live Performance at "Los Premios 2009"
 Alejandro Sanz — "Looking for Paradise"
 Ashley Tisdale — "It's Alright, It's OK"
 Cobra Starship and Paulina Rubio — "Good Girls Go Bad"/"Ni Rosas Ni Juguetes"
 David Guetta and Kelly Rowland — "When Love Takes Over"
 Fall Out Boy — "I Don't Care"
 Jesse & Joy — "Adiós"
 Nelly Furtado — "Manos al Aire"
 Panda — "Sólo a Terceros"
 Placebo — "Ashtray Heart"
 Shakira — "Loba"
 The Veronicas — "Untouched"
 Wisin & Yandel and 50 Cent — "Mujeres in the Club"

Agent of Change
 Shakira

MTV Legend Award
 Café Tacuba

Performances

Buenos Aires
 Miranda! — "Es Imposible!", "Hola", "Perfecta", "Yo Te Diré", "Lo Que Siento por Tí", "Mentía", "Enamorada", "El Profe" and "Don" (featuring Pablo Lescano)
 Zuker — DJed at the end of the Buenos Aires event

Mexico City
 Jesse & Joy — "Adiós", "Si te Vas", "Volveré", "Chocolate", "Electricidad", "Ya no Quiero" and "Espacio Sideral"
 Panda — "Sólo a Terceros", "Cita en el Quirófano", "Los Malaventurados No Lloran" and "Narcisista por Excelencia
 Placebo — "Ashtray Heart", "For What It's Worth", "Battle for the Sun", "Special Needs", "Special K" and "Every You, Every Me"
 Sussie 4 — DJed at the end of the Mexico City event

Bogotá
 Alejandro Sanz — "Looking for Paradise" and "Corazón Partío"
 Fanny Lu and Doctor Krápula — "Tú No Eres para Mi"
 Shakira — "Loba"
 The Veronicas — "Untouched", "Everything I'm Not", "Take Me on the Floor" and "4Ever"
 Diva Gash — DJed at the end of the Bogotá event

Los Angeles
 Nelly Furtado — "Manos Al Aire"
 Cobra Starship and Paulina Rubio — "Good Girls Go Bad"/"Ni Rosas Ni Juguetes"
 Ashley Tisdale — "It's Alright, It's OK"
 Wisin & Yandel and 50 Cent — "Mujeres in the Club"/"Abusadora"
 David Guetta and Kelly Rowland — "When Love Takes Over"
 Fall Out Boy — "I Don't Care"

Appearances

Buenos Aires
 Fabio Posca and Brenda Asnicar — presented Best New Artist — South
 Mike Amigorena and Déborah de Corral — presented Best Artist — South

Mexico City
 Motel and Ana Brenda Contreras — introduced Jesse & Joy
 Leonardo de Lozanne and Eiza González — presented Best New Artist — North
 Moderatto and Paola Espinosa — introduced Panda
 Aleks Syntek and Paty Garza — presented Best Artist — North
 Belanova — introduced Placebo

Bogotá
 Juanes — introduced Alejandro Sanz
 Carlos Vives — presented Agent of Change
 Fonseca — introduced Shakira
 Taliana Vargas and Johanna Carreño — presented Best Artist — Central
 María Gabriela de Faría and Reinaldo Zavarce — introduced The Veronicas (also hosted the event's red carpet pre-show)
 Connie Camelo and CAMO — presented Best New Artist — Central
 Kudai — introduced Doctor Krápula and Fanny Lu

Los Angeles
Audrina Patridge and Wilmer Valderrama — presented Best Solo Artist
Kelly Osbourne and Drake Bell — introduced Cobra Starship
Snoop Dogg and Anahí — presented Video of the Year
Backstreet Boys and Jery Sandoval — presented Best Pop Artist
Dave Navarro and Tommy Lee — presented Best Rock Artist
Alessandra Ambrosio and Alfonso Herrera — introduced Ashley Tisdale
Miranda Cosgrove and PeeWee — introduced Wisin & Yandel and 50 Cent
Selena Gomez and Reik — presented Best Duo or Group
Ximena Sariñana and Zoé — introduced Morrissey
Morrissey — presented Legend Award
Sofia Vergara and 50 Cent — presented Artist of the Year
Amandititita with the hosts  — introduced Fall Out Boy

External links
 Los Premios MTV official website

References

Latin American music
MTV Video Music Awards
2009 music awards